Videomatch was a late-night 120-minute Argentine comedy show hosted by Marcelo Tinelli and broadcast on Telefe that first aired in March 1, 1990 in the midnight time slot.

Currently the show still airs under the name of Showmatch (changing its name after switching to channel 9).  A late-night talk show is a type of talk show that first became popular in the United States. It's mostly made up of comedic monologues regarding the news of the day, guest interviews, comic sketches, and musical performances. It is distinguished by spontaneous discussion and an impression of immediacy and intimacy, as if the host were addressing to everyone of the millions of viewers individually.

History 

Videomatch began as a sports show. Since its second year, sports were replaced with bloopers, and then comedy sketches, increasing its success to a large extent. According to Tinelli: 

In this way, Tinelli got a second show, Ritmo de la noche, comprising the same cast of Videomatch but airing Sundays on primetime.

Videomatch continued on Telefe until 2004, with excellent ratings, being the most-watched show in all its years and becoming a "classic"; until an argument between Marcelo Tinelli and Claudio Villaruel (Director of Programming for Telefe) led to Tinelli leaving the channel. 
The show then switched to Channel 9, changing its name to Showmatch.

Characters and skits 

The program was broadcast by Telefe for more than 15 years, and was composed of a team that was changed over the years, starting with sports commentators Gonzalo Bonadeo, Osvaldo Príncipi, Felipe Mc Gough, Henry de Ridder, Daniel Jacubovich, Marcelo "Teto" Medina, Ricardo "Lanchita" Bissio, Alejandro Coccia and others. And then it switched to comedians such as Leo Rosenwasser, Hugo Varela, Pablo Granados, Pachu Peña, Freddy Villareal, José María Listorti, Campi, Naim Sibara (El Turco Naim), Miguel Ángel Rodríguez, Diego Korol, Marcelo De Bellis, Larry de Clay, Rodrigo Rodríguez, Roberto Peña, Sergio Gonal, Waldo (Álvaro Navia), Yayo (José Carlos Guridi), Toti Ciliberto, Sebastián Almada and Pichu (Fernando Straneo).

Among its best remembered sketches are:

 Hidden cameras:

Segments 
 "30 Segundos de Fama" (30 seconds of fame) was a segment of the program in 2003. The latter consisted in showing contestants not from the popular medium, who display their talents or special abilities for less or the same period to 30 seconds, although usually exceed this estimated time to expose their talents more clearly. The segment was later transferred to Showmatch when the program moved to Canal 9, and later to Canal 13. However, in 2006, it was replaced by Bailando por un Sueño due to low ratings.
 "Animalmatch"
 "Comic"
 "Mimic"

Musical themes 
Among the most remembered opening themes are songs like "Twist and Shout" (by The Beatles), 19-2000 (by Gorillaz), "Vicio" (by Los Ratones Paranoicos), Pink (by Aerosmith) and more.

Comic book adaptation
Walter Carzon created a comic strip based on El Oso Arturo, a mascot character who frequently appeared in VideoMatch.

International versions
 Franchise with a currently airing season
 Franchise awaiting confirmation
 Franchise with an upcoming season
 Franchise with an unknown status
 Franchise that was cancelled during development
 Franchise no longer in production
 Franchise on hold

Awards 
Marcelo Tinelli received the Golden Martín Fierro Award in 1998, and his show won more than 20 statuettes since.

Sources

External links 
 YouTube:Interview with a badly operated man 
 YouTube:The worst classroom of your life
 

Argentine variety television shows
Argentine comedy television series
1989 Argentine television series debuts
2004 Argentine television series endings
1980s Argentine television series
1990s Argentine television series
2000s Argentine television series
Television shows adapted into comics